The 1995 Rugby League World Cup knockout stage took place after the group stage of the 1995 Rugby League World Cup and culminated in the 1995 Rugby League World Cup Final.

The Semi-finals consisted of four teams; 1st and 2nd from Group A, 1st from Group B and 1st from Group C.

Bracket

Semi-finals

England (A1) vs Wales (C1)
Inspirational Welsh captain Jonathan Davies announced his representative retirement following the match.

Australia (A2) vs New Zealand (B1)
After showing very little form in their group games, New Zealand almost produced a boilover against Australia in Huddersfield. The Kangaroos were leading 20–16 with just 3 minutes remaining before a Kevin Iro try leveled the scores leaving 'superboot' Matthew Ridge with a sideline conversion to send the Kiwis into the Final at Wembley. However, Ridge shanked the kick and the scores remained 20–all at the end of regulation time. In extra time, Terry Hill and Brad Fittler scored for the Australian's to give them a 30–20 win and put them into their 7th consecutive World Cup Final. Steve Menzies crossed for 2 tries for Australia including a 70-metre run in the second half for his second try after being put into space by Andrew Johns. Menzies had enough pace to out-distance Manly-Warringah teammate Ridge and bump off Sean Hoppe 5 metres from the line to score.

Final: England vs Australia

References

External links
1995 World Cup audio highlights
1995 World Cup Final at rlphotos.com
1995 World Cup data at hunterlink.net.au
1995 World Cup at rlif.com
1995 World Cup at rlhalloffame.org.uk
1995 World Cup at rugbyleagueproject.com
1995 World Cup at 188-rugby-league.co.uk